Sir John Stafford Cripps, CBE (10 May 1912 – 9 August 1993) was a British journalist and campaigner. He was chairman of the Countryside Commission from 1970 to 1977.

He was the son of the Labour politician Sir Stafford Cripps.

References

External links 

 

Knights Bachelor
1993 deaths
Commanders of the Order of the British Empire
English Quakers
English journalists
Labour Party (UK) parliamentary candidates
English magazine editors
People educated at Winchester College
Alumni of Balliol College, Oxford
English farmers
1912 births